Barletta railway station is the main station serving the city and comune of Barletta, in the region of Apulia, southern Italy.  Opened in 1864, it forms part of the Adriatic Railway (Ancona–Lecce), and is also a junction station for two other, regional, lines, the Barletta–Spinazzola railway, and the Bari–Barletta railway, operated by Ferrotramviaria.

In the past, the station was also connected with the Port of Barletta, by a line ending at Barletta Marittima railway station, but that connection is now closed.

The station is currently managed by Rete Ferroviaria Italiana (RFI).  However, the commercial area of the passenger building is managed by Centostazioni.  Train services on the Adriatic Railway and the Barletta–Spinazzola railway are operated by Trenitalia.  Each of these companies is a subsidiary of Ferrovie dello Stato (FS), Italy's state-owned rail company.

Services on the Ferrovie del Nord Barese are operated by Ferrotramviaria (FT).

Location
Barletta railway station is situated at Piazza Francesco Conteduca, on the southern edge of the city centre.

History
The station was opened on 11 August 1864, upon the inauguration of the Foggia–Trani section of the Adriatic Railway.

On 1 October 1883, the station became a break of gauge junction station, upon the opening of the FNB, which was then a  narrow gauge line. The FNB station was, and still is, located in the same station yard, and is connected with the mainline station via a covered walkway, with direct access from Via Vittorio Veneto.

On 1 August 1895, the station also became a junction for the then newly opened standard gauge Barletta–Spinazzola railway.  The since closed link between the station and Barletta Marittima, mentioned above, was opened on 1 August 1895.

Between 1959 and 1965, services on the FNB were suspended while that line was converted to standard gauge.

Features
The station has a large passenger building housing several facilities, including a ticket office, waiting room, bar and office of traffic management.  Above the ground floor where these services are found, the building is equipped with two additional floors.

In the station yard, there are seven through tracks used for passenger service.  The first five are used by Trenitalia trains, while the latter two are used as a terminus for FNB trains. The tracks are served by four platforms with shelters and connecting subways.

There are other through tracks serving the goods yard, although it is not used much today, especially in light of the closure of the line to Barletta Marittima.

The station also has a locomotive shed.

Train services
The station has about three million passenger movements each year, due mainly to passenger interchanges between different lines and between train and bus.

All trains stop at the station, including regional, interregional, express, InterCity and Eurostar.  The station is also the terminus for all secondary line trains to Spinazzola and Bari Centrale (via the FNB), respectively.  The destinations of trains departing from the station vary widely, because there are so many trains.

The station is served by the following services (incomplete):

High speed services (Frecciargento) Rome - Foggia - Bari - Brindisi - Lecce
High speed services (Frecciabianca) Milan - Parma - Bologna - Ancona - Pescara - Foggia - Bari - Brindisi - Lecce
High speed services (Frecciabianca) Milan - Parma - Bologna - Ancona - Pescara - Foggia - Bari - Taranto
High speed services (Frecciabianca) Turin - Parma - Bologna - Ancona - Pescara - Foggia - Bari - Brindisi - Lecce
High speed services (Frecciabianca) Venice - Padua - Bologna - Ancona - Pescara - Foggia - Bari - Brindisi - Lecce
Intercity services Rome - Foggia - Bari (- Taranto)
Intercity services Bologna - Rimini - Ancona - Pescara - Foggia - Bari - Brindisi - Lecce
Intercity services Bologna - Rimini - Ancona - Pescara - Foggia - Bari - Taranto
Night train (Intercity Notte) Rome - Foggia - Bari - Brindisi - Lecce
Night train (Intercity Notte) Milan - Parma - Bolgona - Ancona - Pescara - Foggia - Bari - Brindisi - Lecce
Night train (Intercity Notte) Milan - Ancona - Pescara - Foggia - Bari - Taranto - Brindisi - Lecce
Night train (Intercity Notte) Turin - Alessandria - Bolgona - Ancona - Pescara - Foggia - Bari - Brindisi - Lecce
Regional services (Treno regionale) Foggia - Barletta - Bari
Bari Metropolitan services (FR2) Barletta - Andria - Bitonto - Aeroporto - Bari

See also

History of rail transport in Italy
List of railway stations in Apulia
Rail transport in Italy
Railway stations in Italy

References

External links

This article is based upon a translation of the Italian language version as at January 2011.

Railway Station
Railway stations in Apulia
Railway stations opened in 1864
Buildings and structures in the Province of Barletta-Andria-Trani